The 1942 Bulgarian Cup was the 5th season of the Bulgarian Cup (in this period the tournament was named Tsar's Cup). Levski Sofia won the competition, beating Sportklub Plovdiv in the final at the Yunak Stadium in Sofia.

First round

|}

Quarter-finals

|}

Semi-finals

|-
!colspan="3" style="background-color:#D0F0C0; text-align:left;" |Replay

|}

Final

Details

References

1942
1941–42 domestic association football cups
Cup